State Highway 55 (SH-55) is an Idaho highway from Marsing to New Meadows, connecting with US-95 at both ends.

From Marsing it travels east to Nampa, Meridian, and Eagle, then north to Horseshoe Bend. SH-55 then climbs the Payette River to Banks, then its north fork to the Long Valley, through the towns of Cascade and McCall. After descending a narrow canyon to Meadows, SH-55 terminates in New Meadows at the junction with US-95.

Route description

The highway heads eastward as it travels through Marsing, crosses the Snake River and the Snake River Valley AVA. The highway continues east to Nampa (mostly as Karcher Road), where it meets Interstate 84 and 

The highway is cosigned with those routes as it heads eastward to Meridian. SH-55 turns northward at Eagle Road and crosses the Boise River near Eagle. The junction with SH-44 is in Eagle, where the routes are briefly cosigned.

The new multi-lane grade was completed in late 1991; the old curvier road is to the west, long plagued by landslides and closures. North of Horseshoe Bend, the highway ascends the Payette River and passes through several recreational areas, which offer rafting, fishing, and camping activities. SH-55 continues north, through the small communities of Banks and Smiths Ferry, then crosses the river via the Rainbow Bridge (built in 1933), originally known as the North Fork Bridge.

SH-55 then climbs Round Valley Creek to Round Valley, and continues northward through the extended Long Valley of Valley County to the county seat of Cascade. The route continues northward to Donnelly, the turnoff for Tamarack Resort, located to the southwest, on the western shore of the reservoir. SH-55 continues north through the valley to McCall, at the south shore of Payette Lake, the host of many scenic, recreational, and winter activities.

Meeting the south shore of Payette Lake, State Highway 55 turns westward as Lake Street through McCall and its west "Lardo" area.

State Highway 55, from Eagle north to US-95 in New Meadows, is the Payette River Scenic Byway, part of the National Scenic Byways Program.

History
The original State Highway 55 ran from US-2 in Colburn to what is now State Highway 200. This highway was decommissioned in October 1955, and is now Colburn-Culver Road.

The current route was designated as State Highway 55 in September 1967, replacing former State Highway 72 and former State Highway 15. Idaho State Highway 72 has since been reassigned to another road.

State Highway 55 was originally routed through downtown Boise, and followed the old alignment of State Highway 44 down State Street and 23rd Street to Fairview Avenue. From there it turned westward with US-20, US-26 and US-30. The highway continued westward on the Boise Connector then Interstate 180N (now Interstate 184), and continued west along Interstate 80N (now Interstate 84), where it followed its present alignment toward Nampa.

Prior to the 1990s, the eastern junction with SH-44 in Eagle was a quarter-mile (0.4 km) east at Horseshoe Bend Road, which was SH-55.

In late 2006, the route was realigned away from downtown Nampa when a new interchange, Interchange #33 along Interstate 84 was opened and provided a more direct connection to State Highway 55 from the Interstate. The segments of SH-55 following the former Nampa Boulevard (now Northside Boulevard) and Caldwell Boulevard (now Business Route 84) through Nampa have been decommissioned favoring the more direct routing. From there the highway followed its current alignment from that point to Marsing and its southern terminus at US-95.

Major intersections

See also

 List of state highways in Idaho
 List of highways numbered 55

References

External links

 Visit Idaho: Payette River Scenic Byway
 David Rumsey Map Collection – Historic road map (1937) – Idaho, Montana, Wyoming – Texaco (Rand McNally)
 Idaho highway map (1956) – Shell (H.M. Gousha)

055
Transportation in Owyhee County, Idaho
Transportation in Canyon County, Idaho
Transportation in Ada County, Idaho
Transportation in Boise County, Idaho
Transportation in Valley County, Idaho
Transportation in Adams County, Idaho